Sharon Evans Finneran (born February 4, 1946), also known by her married name Sharon Rittenhouse, is an American former competition swimmer, Olympic medalist, and former world record-holder in three events.  She represented the United States as an 18-year-old at the 1964 Summer Olympics in Tokyo.  Finneran received a silver medal for her second-place finish in the women's 400-meter individual medley – completing an all-American sweep of the event with Donna de Varona and Martha Randall. In 1981 she was inducted into the International Swimming Hall of Fame.

In retirement Finneran took part in masters swimming tournaments. Her four siblings were competitive swimmers, divers and water polo players. Her brother Mike Finneran placed fifth in springboard diving at the 1972 Summer Olympics, and her daughter Ariel Rittenhouse finished fourth at the 2008 Summer Olympics, also in springboard diving.

See also
 List of members of the International Swimming Hall of Fame
 List of Olympic medalists in swimming (women)
 World record progression 200 metres butterfly
 World record progression 400 metres individual medley
 World record progression 800 metres freestyle

References

1946 births
Living people
American female medley swimmers
Olympic silver medalists for the United States in swimming
People from Rockville Centre, New York
Swimmers at the 1964 Summer Olympics
Medalists at the 1964 Summer Olympics
Pan American Games gold medalists for the United States
Pan American Games medalists in swimming
Swimmers at the 1963 Pan American Games
Medalists at the 1963 Pan American Games
20th-century American women